The Vahdat Hall ( – Tālār e Vahdat means "Unity Hall"), formerly the Roudaki Hall ( – Tālār-e Rudaki), is a performing arts complex in Tehran, Iran.

History

Around the 1950s and 1970s, the Iranian national stage had become the most famous performing scene for known international artists and troupes in West Asia, with the Vahdat Hall constructed in the capital of the country to function as the national stage for opera and ballet performances.

Construction
The complex was designed by architect Eugene Aftandilian, influenced by the Vienna State Opera, and was constructed during a period of ten years starting in 1957. It was equipped with the latest lighting and sound system technologies of the time, with revolving and moving stages. The main stage consists of three different levels (podiums). The auditorium seats 1200 and has two tiers of boxes and balconies. The venue was fully supplied by Siemens Electrics. The main curtain in proscenium has a motif of a phoenix rising from the ashes, with the style of Persian miniature.

Just before the completion of Tehran's new opera house, Nejad Ahmadzadeh, artistic director of the Iranian National Ballet Company, was sent by the Ministry of Culture and Arts to the United States to visit their opera houses and study administrative, organizational, and technical constructions of American opera establishments that were deemed to be the most modern in the West. At his return, he was appointed as manager of the upcoming opera house, and established the technical, administrative, and artistic sections of the Vahdat Hall. The constructions of the hall were eventually completed in 1967.

Inauguration

As part of the Shah's White Revolution, the Vahdat Hall of Tehran was constructed to function as the national stage for music, opera, and ballet, and was inaugurated by former king Mohammad Reza Pahlavi on October 26, 1967, with the performance of The Rustic Festival, the first Persian opera, composed by Ahmad Pejman. Two weeks of full house performances by international ensembles marked the coronation festivities. Numerous orchestras, opera singers, and dance companies were invited to perform for the occasion.

The hall is home to the Tehran Symphony Orchestra, Tehran Opera Orchestra, and the Iranian National Ballet Company. Other troupes, ensembles, and artists, such as the Iranian folk dancers, also used the stage of the Vahdat Hall for their presentations.

Productions and guest presentations

Before the 1979 Revolution

Ballet

 Bijan and Manijeh (1975)
 La Bayadère (Season 1972–73)
 Myth of the Creation (1971)
 Nutcracker (1971)
 Bolero
 The Firebird (1967)
 Carmina Burana
 The Witch Boy
 The Fountain of Bakhchisarai (Season 73–74)
 Swan Lake (Season 1971–72)
 Petroushka
 Les Sylphides
 Giselle (Season 1970–71)
 La Fille Mal Gardée
 Romeo and Juliet (1968)
 Scheherazade
 Coppélia (Season 1972–72)
 Miss Julie
 Cinderella (1969)
 Serenade
 The Sleeping Beauty (1978)

Opera

  The Rustic Festival  1967
 Hero of Sahand (Delavareh Sahand)1968
 Pardis and Parisa
 La traviata
 Orfeo ed Euridice
 Madama Butterfly
 Turandot (1971)
 La bohème
 Carmen
 Nabucco (1976)
 Falstaff (1977)
 Werther (1977)
 Die Zauberflöte (1978)

Various national and international festivals were organized at the Roudaki Hall, including:

 International Film Festival
 Ballet and Dance Festival
 Folk Dance Festival
 Annual Festival of Culture and Arts

Since the inauguration of the Roudaki Hall in 1967 until the last stagings in the fall season of 1978, world famous music, opera, and dance artists visited Iran to stage their works. Presentations of the guest artists and ensembles included:

Guest ballet companies

Kirov Ballet (Mariinsky Ballet)
 The Igor Moiseyev Ballet
 Le Grand Ballet Classique de France
 Antonio Gades Flamenco Ensemble
Stuttgart Ballet
 Berliner Ballett
 Le Ballet de XXe Siécle (Ballet of the 20th Century)
 Nederlands Dans Theater (1977)

Guest ballet artists (dancers / choreographers)

 Rudolf Nureyev
 Margot Fonteyn
 Robert de Warren
 Liane Daydé
 William Dollar
 John Cranko
 Marcia Haydée
 Richard Cragun
 Robert Urazgildiev
 Maurice Béjart
 Alvin Ailey
 Jiri Kylian

Guest opera singers 

Elisabeth Schwarzkopf
Giuseppe Taddei
Cesare Siepi
Leo Goeke
Delme Bryn-Jones
Ingrid Rezai 
Anayatolla Rezai
Monier Vaquilli

Guest music ensembles
Moscow Symphony Orchestra
Los Angeles Philharmonic Orchestra
Berliner Philharmoniker
Stuttgarter Kammerorchester

Guest musicians / conductors

 Herbert von Karajan
 Aram Khachaturian
 Yehudi Menuhin
 Sir Charles Groves
 Zubin Mehta
 Ruggiero Ricci
 Henryk Szeryng
 Claudio Arrau
 Arthur Rubinstein
 John Ogdon

Other presentations

Marcel Marceau, the pantomime artist (1978)

After the 1979 Revolution
Roudaki Hall has remained the most important venue of Tehran. Concerts of traditional Iranian music, pop, and classical symphonic and orchestral music are staged regularly. After 1979 Revolution, Poetry Council at Office of Poetry and Music of  Ministry of culture was formed in Rudaki Hall to preserve music in Iran. Some famous poets worked there, like: Mehrdad Avesta, Ahmad NikTalab (after him, Babak Niktalab), Mohammad Ali Bahmani, Moshfegh Kashani.

Among the presentations after the 1979 Revolution are:

Concerts 
 Vasl-e-Yar Ensemble
 Choir of Gorgin Mousissian
Tehran Symphony Orchestra
Nour Ensemble
Bob Belden's ANIMATION

Artists

 Loris Tjeknavorian
 Mohammad Reza Shajarian
 Hossein Alizadeh
 Bardia Sadrenoori
 Ahmad Pejman
 Parvaz Homay
 Bagher Moazen
 Peyman Yazdanian
 Mohammad Esmaili
 Alireza Ghorbani
 Homayoun Shajarian
 Kayhan Kalhor
 Mohammad Reza Shajarian
 Milad Derakhshani
 Alireza Eftekhari

Events 
 International Fajr Film Festival
 International Fajr Theater Festival
 Tehran Art Expo.

Guest presentation 
 Dundee Repertory Theater

Specifications

Total capacity of the hall is about 750 seats; with 500 seats in the main hall, and 250 seats in the balconies.

Stage Dimensions
 Proscenium opening: 12m
 Stage depth: 35m
 From hall's end to the proscenium opening: 23.75m
 Stage height: 28m
 Deck height: 85 cm
 Proscenium opening height: 7m
 Forestage: 2.70m

Operational and artistic directors

General directors
 Hamed Rowhani (1967–?)
 Sadi Hassani (in between the other two)
 Abedin Zanganeh (?–1979)
? (1979–?) (after the 1979 Revolution and before the re-organization of the hall in 2003)

Following a legislation from the Parliament of Iran in 2003, the operation management of the hall was reorganized. A new non-governmental public foundation was established in order to be in charge of the Roudaki Hall. The CEOs of Roudaki Foundation, responsible for the operation of Roudaki Hall have been:

 Mehdi Massoudshahi (2003–2008)
 Ali Asghar Amirnia (2008–2010)
 Hossein Parsaee (2010–2013)
 Hossein Seyfi (2013–?)
 Bahram Jamali (?–present)

Ballet directors
 Nejad Ahmadzadeh (1967–1976)
The Iranian National Ballet Company was founded in 1958 and moved to the Roudaki Hall in 1967.
 Ali Pourfarrokh (1976–1979) held the position until disbanding of the Iranian National Ballet.

Opera directors
 Enayat Rezai (1967–1979)

http://www.operanostalgia.be/html/ROUDAKIHALL2016.html

Music directors
?Maestro Farhad Mechkat
 Ali (Alexander) Rahbari (2015–present)

Gallery

References
 Citations

 Bibliography
Fajr Theater Festival
Kiann, Nima. (2000). Persian Dance and Its Forgotten History
Kiann, Nima (2015). The History of Ballet in Iran. Wiesbaden: Reichert Publishing

External links

Official Website of Roudaki Foundation
Les Ballets Persans, the recreation of the Iranian National Ballet Company
The chronology of the Iranian National Ballet Company and Les Ballets Persans

Operanostalgia Enayat Rezai

Theatres in Iran
Opera houses in Iran
Music venues completed in 1967
Buildings and structures in Tehran
Culture in Tehran
Tourist attractions in Tehran